Gabriel Jesús Castellón Velazquez (born 8 September 1993) is a Chilean footballer that currently plays for Huachipato of the Chilean Primera División.

International career
He was a substitute for Chile in the 2017 China Cup – Chile became the champion – and in the friendly match against Bolivia on March 26, 2021. Later, he was called-up to the Chile squad for the 2022 FIFA World Cup qualifiers against Argentina and Bolivia on 3 and 8 June 2021 respectively.

Honours

Club
Santiago Wanderers
 Copa Chile (1): 2017

International
Chile
 China Cup (1): 2017

References

External links
 
 

1993 births
Living people
People from Valparaíso
People from Valparaíso Province
People from Valparaíso Region
Chilean footballers
Chile international footballers
Santiago Wanderers footballers
Deportes Colchagua footballers
C.D. Huachipato footballers
Chilean Primera División players
Primera B de Chile players
Segunda División Profesional de Chile players
Sportspeople from Valparaíso
Association football goalkeepers
2021 Copa América players